Morphopsis is a genus of butterflies endemic to New Guinea.

Species
Morphopsis albertisi Oberthür, 1880
Morphopsis biakensis Joicey & Talbot, 1916
Morphopsis meeki Rothschild & Jordan, 1905
Morphopsis phippsi Joicey & Talbot, 1922
Morphopsis ula Rothschild & Jordan, 1905

References

External links
Tree of Life Web Project

Satyrinae
Butterfly genera
Endemic fauna of New Guinea